TV6 was a television channel started by Kinnevik as a channel aimed at women. The channel showed TV shows such as Ricki Lake and Dynasty. During the daytime, the shopping channel TVG would broadcast on the same channel as TV6.

In 1996 Kinnevik started the sports channel Sportkanalen, which broadcast on the same channel as TV6 during the weekend.

On February 2, 1998 the channel was rebranded as Viasat Nature/Crime.

External links
TV Ark

Television stations in Denmark
Defunct television channels in Sweden
Modern Times Group
Television channels and stations established in 1994
Television channels and stations disestablished in 1998